is a 2011 Japanese film based on the novel of the same name by Shinobu Gotoh. The film is directed by Kenji Yokoi and stars Kyousuke Hamao and Daisuke Watanabe.

Plot

The death anniversary of Takumi's older brother is approaching and when Gui tells Takumi that he wishes to visit his brother's grave with him, it makes Takumi very happy as he has intended to invite Gui too. However, on the same day, there is a snooker tournament organised by the school to welcome new students. When Takumi finds out that Gui will be taking part in the tournament, he feels betrayed and upset, believing Gui has broken his promise and that he has never intended to go with him. Can Gui participate in the tournament and yet not break his promise to Takumi?

Cast
Kyousuke Hamao as Takumi Hayama
Daisuke Watanabe as Giichi "Gui" Saki
Yukihiro Takiguchi as Shōzō Aikaike
Ryōma Baba as Arata Misu

References

External links
Official web site

2011 films
Boys' love films
Films based on Japanese novels
Films set in Japan
2010s Japanese-language films
Gay-related films
Japanese LGBT-related films
2010 LGBT-related films
2010 films
2010 romantic drama films
LGBT-related romantic drama films
2011 drama films
2010s Japanese films